The Barclays Group Staff Union was a trade union representing workers at Barclays Bank in the United Kingdom.

The union was founded in about 1918 as the Barclays Bank Staff Association.  It was registered as an independent trade union in about 1980, and by the mid-1990s had more than 46,000 members, representing over half of the bank's employees.  In 1998, the union changed its name to UNiFI, then the following year merged with the Banking, Insurance and Finance Union and the NatWest Staff Association to form the very similarly named UNIFI.

General Secretaries
c.1960: Cyril Kempson
1977: Eddie Gale
1993: Paul Snowball

References

External links
Catalogue of the BGSU archives, held at the Modern Records Centre, University of Warwick

Trade unions established in 1918
Finance sector trade unions
Defunct trade unions of the United Kingdom
Trade unions disestablished in 1999
1918 establishments in the United Kingdom
Trade unions based in West Sussex